Jay Norbert Trumbull (born February 21, 1989) is a Republican politician who served as a member of the Florida House of Representatives, representing the 6th District, which includes Panama City in southern Bay County, until 2022. He currently serves as a Senator for the 2nd district of Florida.

History
Trumbull was born in Panama City, Florida, and attended Bay High School and Auburn University, where he graduated with his bachelors degree in small business management and entrepreneurship. After graduation he worked for his family's bottled water and water conditioning business as part of the management team.

Florida House of Representatives
In 2014 Trumbull ran to succeed incumbent State Representative Jimmy Patronis, who was unable to seek re-election due to term limits. He faced former Bay County School Board Member Thelma Rohan, Melissa Hagan, and Tho Bishop in the Republican primary, where he campaigned on his support for making Florida "the most business-friendly place in the country," which he said was achievable with lower taxes, less government regulation, and lawsuit reform.

Trumbull won the primary with 43% of the vote to Rohan's 24%, Hagan's 23%, and Bishop's 10%, and advanced to the general election, where he faced Jamie Shepard, the Democratic nominee, and Henry Newman Lawrence, the Green Party nominee. He campaigned as a supporter of lower taxes and reduced regulation, and voiced his opposition to the Common Core State Standards Initiative. Trumbull won the general election with 69% of the vote to Shepard's 28% and Newman's 3%.

Elections

2014

2016 
Elections for the Florida House of Representatives took place in 2016. The primary election took place on August 30, 2016, and the general election was held on November 8, 2016. The candidate filing deadline was June 24, 2016.

Incumbent Jay Trumball ran unopposed in the Florida House of Representatives District 6 Republican primary.

Incumbent Jay Trumbull ran unopposed in the Florida House of Representatives District 6 general election.

2018 
Incumbent Jay Trumball ran unopposed in the Florida House of Representatives District 6 Republican primary.

2020

2022

References

External links
Florida House of Representatives - Jay Trumbull
Jay Trumbull for State Representative

Republican Party members of the Florida House of Representatives
1989 births
Living people
People from Panama City, Florida
Auburn University alumni
21st-century American politicians